The Midland Great Western Railway (MGWR) C Class was a class of 4-4-0 locomotives designed and built at Broadstone by Edward Cusack between 1909 and 1915 using parts obtained from Kitson and Company.  They replaced the earlier 7-12 class.  The class survived through the Great Southern Railways (GSR) era from 1925-1944 and were withdrawn in the 1950s under Córas Iompair Éireann.

Locomotives
The class consisted of nine locomotives as follows:

History
From their introduction in 1909 the class was originally designed to be used principally on trains on the Sligo and Mayo branches.  Their large driving wheels caused low acceleration and difficulties on gradients so they were deployed to Dublin-Galway slow passenger work.  Poor riding also led to a high incidence of breaking of bogie springs.

In 1912 during the coal strike of that year No. 10 was converted to an oil burning locomotive using Holden oil burning apparatus.

The class were rebuilt with superheated boilers and new cabs over their long lives beginning in the 1920s. Those also having piston-valves formed GSR Class 540 whilst those retaining slide values going to GSR Class 536.  They were withdrawn in the 1950s, Class 536 with their poorer performance first.

Liveries
When introduced the locomotives carried an apple green livery with black edged with white lining.  The tender was lettered MGWR with the company seal between the letters G and W.  They carried brass nameplates on the lead driving when splasher with the builders plate and number on the cabside.  From 1915 after W.H. Morton was appointed Chief Mechanical Engineer of the MGWR the engines were repainted black until the merger of the MGWR into the Great Southern Railways in 1925. From then until withdrawal, all were painted plain grey, initially with cast cabside numberplates (also plain grey), but from about 1949 these were gradually removed with pale yellow painted numerals substituted.

References and sources

References

Sources

 
 
 

4-4-0 locomotives
5 ft 3 in gauge locomotives
Railway locomotives introduced in 1909
C
Scrapped locomotives
Steam locomotives of Ireland